General Yates may refer to:

Arthur Wolcott Yates (1865–1930), U.S. Army brigadier general
David Peel Yates (1911–1978), British Army lieutenant general
Donald Norton Yates (1909–1993), U.S. Army Air Force major general
Elmer P. Yates (1917–2011), U.S. Army Corps of Engineers major general
Ronald W. Yates (born 1938), U.S. Army Air Force general
Walter H. Yates Jr. (born 1941), U.S. Army brigadier general